Gros Morne or Gros-Morne may refer to:
 Gros-Morne, Artibonite, a commune in the Artibonite department in Haiti
 Gros Morne, Grand'Anse, rural settlement in the Moron commune of Haiti
 Gros-Morne, Martinique, a commune in the French overseas department of Martinique
 Gros Morne, Newfoundland, a mountain located in western Newfoundland
 Gros Morne National Park, on the west coast of Newfoundland
 Gros Morne, Réunion, a volcanic peak on the island of Réunion
 Gros Morne, Saint Lucia, a mountain located in the Castries District of Saint Lucia
 Gros Morne, Trinidad, a mount part of the Trinity Hills

See also
 Gros (disambiguation)
 Morne (disambiguation)